Mathematics and Computing Colleges were introduced in England in 2002 and Northern Ireland in 2006 as part of the Government's Specialist Schools programme which was designed to raise standards in secondary education. Specialist schools focus on their chosen specialism but must also meet the requirements of the National Curriculum and deliver a broad and balanced education to all their pupils. Mathematics and Computing Colleges must focus on mathematics and either computing or ICT.

Colleges are expected to disseminate good practice and share resources with other schools and the wider community. They often develop active partnerships with local organisations and their feeder primary schools. They also work with local businesses to promote the use of mathematics and computing outside of school.

In 2007 there were 222 schools in England which were designated as specialist Mathematics and Computing Colleges. A further 21 schools were designated in combined specialisms which included mathematics and computing, and 15 had a second specialism in Mathematics and Computing.

The Specialist Schools programme ended in 2011. Since then, schools in England have to either become an academy or apply through the Dedicated Schools Grant if they wish to become a Mathematics and Computing College. As of 2021 there are few Mathematics and Computing Colleges left in the United Kingdom.

References

External links
 Vision for Mathematics and Computing Colleges, The Standards Site
 Specialist Schools Programme

Computer science education in the United Kingdom
Mathematics education in the United Kingdom
2002 introductions
Specialist schools programme